Roman theatre may refer to:

Theatre of ancient Rome, the theatrical styles of Ancient Rome
Roman theatre (structure), the theatre buildings of ancient Roman type
Roman Theatre of Arles, an ancient theatre in Arles, France
Roman Theatre (Amman), a 6,000-seat, 2nd-century Roman theatre
Roman Theatre, Aosta, an ancient building in Aosta, north-western Italy
Roman Theatre (Cádiz), an ancient structure in Cádiz, Andalusia, in southern Spain
Roman theatre, Cartagena, an ancient Roman theatre in Cartagena, Spain
Roman Theatre (Mainz), an excavated structure in Mainz, Rhineland-Palatinate, Germany
Roman Theatre (Mérida), an ancient structure in Mérida, Spain
Roman theatre, Verona, an ancient Roman theatre in Verona, northern Italy. Not to be confused with the Roman amphitheatre known as the Verona Arena